John Rogers Dean of Llandaff from 1993 to 1999.

Rogers was born in 1934 and educated at the University of Wales, Oriel College, Oxford and St Stephen's House, Oxford. Ordained in 1960 his first post was at St Martin, Roath.  He served the church in Guyana from 1963 until 1971. He held incumbencies at Caldicot, Monmouth and Ebbw Vale before his appointment as Dean.

He retired to Myddfai, continuing to officiate in parishes around the upper Tywi valley. He died at Llanfair Grange care home, Llandovery on 16 February 2023

References 

1934 births
Alumni of the University of Wales
Alumni of Oriel College, Oxford
Alumni of St Stephen's House, Oxford
Deans of Llandaff
Living people